Wefald is a surname. Notable people with the surname include:

Alexander Wefald (born 1978), Norwegian sprint canoer
Jon Wefald (born 1937), American university president
Knud Wefald (1869–1936), American politician
Robert Wefald (born 1942), American judge
Susan Wefald (born 1947), American politician